The Boston Irish Famine Memorial is a memorial park located on a plaza between Washington Street and School Street in Boston, Massachusetts. The park contains two groups of statues to contrast an Irish family suffering during the Great Famine of 1845–1852 with a prosperous family that had immigrated to America. Funded by a trust led by Boston businessman Thomas Flatley, the park was opened in 1998. It has received contrasting reviews and has since been called "the most mocked and reviled public sculpture in Boston".  The memorial received praise from many newspapers, including the Quincy Patriot Ledger, which wrote, "There are religious and secular monuments to the influence of the Irish all around Boston, but nothing that marks the Gaelic contribution to the city and to this state the way the Irish Famine Memorial will."

Development 
The land for the memorial park was leased to the memorial trust by the Boston Redevelopment Authority in 1998. The $1 million trust was led by Thomas Flatley, an Irish-American real estate tycoon based in Boston, and was supported by Peter Lynch and others, particularly from Boston's Irish-American community.

Description

The statues are the centerpiece of the park and were sculpted by Robert Shure. The two groups represent two families, one starved and ragged owing to the deprivations of the famine, the other well-fed having found prosperity in America. It is said to emphasize the transformation from an "anxious immigrant" to a "future of freedom and opportunity" in America for the Irish, the first of a long line of immigrants to Boston and America. The sculptures are accompanied by eight narrative plaques. The memorial lies on Boston's Freedom Trail (across from the Old South Meeting House)and is visited by more than 3 million people per year.

History 
The statues and park were unveiled on June 28, 1998, to mark 150 years since the height of the Great Famine. Although well received in Boston at the time, the statues were criticized by Fintan O'Toole of the Irish Times who said they represented "pious cliches and dead conventions". In 2013, Sebastian Smee, art critic for The Boston Globe, called it "the most mocked and reviled public sculpture in Boston". Others have decried the monument as a commemoration of the accomplishments of Irish Americans rather than a memorial to the Famine.

Maintenance work has been cut back since Flatley's death in 2008. The Downtown Boston Business Improvement District and a nearby Walgreens pharmacy help with cleaning the park area, but the site was described in 2013 as a "magnet for vagrants and pigeons".

The memorial was the site of a July 2014 rally in support of the sheltering of immigrant children in Boston.  It was also the site, in January 2017, of a protest against a crackdown on illegal immigrants.

See also 
 List of memorials to the Great Famine
The Irish Famine Memorial is part of the Irish Heritage Trail.
 History of Irish Americans in Boston

References

External links 
 

1998 establishments in Massachusetts
1998 sculptures
Monuments and memorials in Boston
Outdoor sculptures in Boston
Sculptures of children in the United States
Sculptures of men in Massachusetts
Sculptures of women in Massachusetts
Statues in Boston